Max Levien (21 May 1885 in Moscow – 17 June 1937 in the Soviet Union) was a leading German-Russian communist politician. He was one of the co-founders of the Communist Party of Germany (KPD). As the first party chairman of the KPD in Bavaria, he was in April 1919 one of the protagonists of the Bavarian Soviet Republic that emerged in the wake of the German November Revolution of 1918.

Life

Early life 
Research has established that Levien was descended from Huguenot immigrants into Russia by the name of Lavigne. Max Levien was born into a German merchant family in Moscow in 1885. His studies began in 1893 at the Moscow German Gymnasium and continued in 1897 in Meissen, Germany, where he graduated in 1902. He discontinued his scientific studies at the University of Halle in the fall of 1905 to participate in the Russian revolution that year. Joining the Socialist Revolutionary Party (SR) in 1906, he was arrested by the Okhrana and sentenced to prison in Moscow in 1907. After his release in 1908, Levien went to Zurich where he continued his studies, and graduated with a doctorate in the summer of 1913. In Switzerland, he joined the Russian Social Democratic Party, had contacts with Lenin and became a follower of the Bolsheviks. After graduation, Levien went to Germany and became a German citizen. On 29 October 1913, he volunteered for the Royal Bavarian Infantry Lifeguards Regiment and served from 1914 to 1918 on most fronts in the First World War, fighting alternately in France, Italy, Serbia and Romania.

Revolution and Council republic 
During the November revolution he was active in the soldiers' councils, working closely together with anarchist writer and activist Erich Mühsam. Levien became chairman of the Munich Soldiers´ Council and the Munich Spartacus group. He participated as a delegate for Munich in the founding convention of the Communist Party of Germany (KPD) over the New Year 1918-19, and became party chairman for KPD in Bavaria. Levien was together with Eugen Leviné one of the leaders of the second phase of the Soviet Republic after the suppression of the right-wing counter-coup on Palm Sunday 13 April 1919. Unlike Leviné, Levien was an ethnic German and not of Jewish descent, but was nevertheless defamed as Jewish by right-wing political opponents. Levien was arrested after the suppression of the Soviet Republic, but managed to flee to Vienna in May 1919. There he was arrested again.

Karl Retzlaw, who personally knew and worked with him, wrote in his biography: "Max Levien was an interesting figure. About 35 years old, medium-sized, full dark hair - "artist's mane" - doctor of science and a great, quick-witted speaker.“

The Austrian government released Levien by the end of 1920. Before that, long negotiations had taken place after the Bavarian judiciary had placed a request for his extradition.

Soviet exile 
Levien settled in Moscow in June 1921, there he first worked in the hunger relief for Soviet Russia. Elected in 1922 into the Executive Committee of the Comintern (ECCI), he worked in his apparatus and participated in 1924 at the 5th World Congress of the Communist International. Levien was later involved in academic work as a journalist and biologist, he was an editor of the philosophical journal Under the Banner of Marxism and lectured at the Communist University of the National Minorities of the West and the Communist Academy and was a member of its presidium. In 1925 he became member of the Communist Party of the Soviet Union. During this time Levien was closely associated with the disgraced former KPD leader Arkadi Maslow.

In the 1930s he had a professorship for History and Philosophy of natural sciences at the Moscow University.

Death 

Eventually Levien fell victim to the Great Terror. He was arrested by the NKVD on 10 December 1936 and was in March 1937 initially sentenced to five years camp imprisonment. But on 16 June the verdict was converted into a death sentence, which was executed he following day.

Max Levien is classified by the Russian historian Alexander Vatlin as a victim of the German operation of the NKVD, even if he was sentenced and executed before Nikolai Yezhov signed the order of its initiation.

Literature 
 Martin H. Geyer: Verkehrte Welt. Revolution, Inflation und Moderne. München 1914–1924, Göttingen, Vandenhoeck & Ruprecht, 1998, p. 82.
 Branko Lazitch; Drachkovitch, Milorad M. (Hgg.): Biographical Dictionary of the Comintern, Stanford/CA, Hoover Institution Press, 1986, p. 259f.
 Natalia Mussienko; Ulla Plener (Hgg.): Verurteilt zur Höchststrafe. Tod durch Erschießen. Todesopfer aus Deutschland und deutscher Nationalität im Großen Terror in der Sowjetunion 1937/1938, Berlin, Dietz, 2006, p. 58.
 Levien, Max. In: Hermann Weber, Andreas Herbst: Deutsche Kommunisten. Biographisches Handbuch 1918 bis 1945. 2., überarbeitete und stark erweiterte Auflage. Karl Dietz, Berlin 2008, . 
 Hermann Weber: „Zu den Beziehungen zwischen der KPD und der Kommunistischen Internationale“, in: Vierteljahrshefte für Zeitgeschichte 16 (1968), 2, p. 177–208, here: p. 188 (PDF).

External links 
 Friedbert Mühldorfer, Spartakusbund, 1915-1919, in: Historisches Lexikon Bayerns

References 

1937 deaths
1885 births
German anti-capitalists
German anti-fascists
Russian anti-fascists
Far-left politicians in Germany
Far-left politics in Russia
German people of Russian descent
Russian people of German descent
Russian expatriates
Soviet journalists
Academic staff of Moscow State University
Communist Party of the Soviet Union members
Communist Party of Germany members
Great Purge victims from Germany
Great Purge victims from Russia
People of the German Revolution of 1918–1919
German people of World War I
Russian people of World War I
People of the Russian Civil War
People of the Russian Revolution
20th-century journalists
Soviet biologists
German revolutionaries
Russian revolutionaries
German Marxists
Russian Marxists
German communists
Russian communists
German socialists
Russian socialists